Kabbe South is the easternmost of the eight electoral constituencies of Zambezi Region of Namibia. The administrative centre of Kabbe South is the settlement of Nakabolelwa. As of 2020, the constituency had 3,751 registered voters. 

Kabbe South was created in August 2013 from the eastern part of Kabbe Constituency, following a recommendation of the Fourth Delimitation Commission of Namibia, and in preparation of the 2014 general election.

Politics
The 2015 regional election was won by Musialela John Likando of the SWAPO Party with 1,189 votes, followed by Bernard Kamwi Shamwazi of the Democratic Turnhalle Alliance (DTA) with 46 votes. Likando was reelected in the 2020 regional election, again winning by over 90% of the public vote.

See also
 Administrative divisions of Namibia

References

Constituencies of Zambezi Region
States and territories established in 2013
2013 establishments in Namibia